The George Washington University Medical Faculty Associates is a non-profit 501(c)3 physician group practice affiliated with the George Washington University. The MFA group practice is made up of academic clinical faculty of the GW Medical School. As of 2015, the group had more than 750 physicians providing medical services to the Washington DC, Northern Virginia, and Maryland areas. The GW Medical Faculty Associates offers over 51 specialty areas of care. The organization is a partner with the George Washington University Hospital and the School of Medicine and Health Sciences.

Robert Kelly became CEO in January 2017 and left in 2020. Stephen Badger left the post in September 2015 after 16 years with MFA.  The current CEO is Barbara L. Bass.

Centers and Institutes
The GW Breast Care Center, the Dr. Cyrus and Myrtle Katzen Cancer Research Center, and the GW Heart & Vascular Institute are headquartered at the GW MFA.

Expansion
In the past, Howard University was a partner of the GW Medical Faculty Associates. Around 200 physicians have since left since the termination of the partnership.

In April 2015, the Medical Faculty Associates announced the acquisition of Metro Immediate and Primary Care (Metro IPC). Metro IPC offers 365-day-a-year service at three locations within Washington DC.

References

George Washington University